Franz Schubert wrote his Sonata in C major for piano four-hands,  812, in June 1824 during his second stay at the Esterházy estate in Zseliz. The extended work, in four movements, has a performance time of around 40 to 45 minutes. It was published as Grand Duo, Op. 140, in 1837, nine years after the composer's death.

Robert Schumann saw Beethoven's influence in the work, and thought of it as the piano version of a symphony. Joseph Joachim's orchestration of the work was performed from the 19th to the 21st century. From the second half of the 20th century the Sonata was however more readily appreciated as a piano piece with orchestral effects, like many other piano works by Schubert, than as a symphony in disguise.

History

In 1818 Count János Károly Esterházy de Galántha hired Schubert as music teacher for his daughters, Mária Terezia and Karoline, when the family was staying at their summer residence in Zseliz, at that time in rural Hungary. Schubert was in Zseliz from 7 July to 19 November, around which time he wrote his Sonata in B-flat major for piano four-hands, D 617. In May 1822, Schubert dedicated his Op. 8, a collection of four songs (and ), to Count János Károly. Later that year the composer contracted syphilis, suffering from the condition for the largest part of 1823 and partially recovering towards the end of the year. His Op. 30, the B-flat major piano duet Sonata of 1818, was published in December. A few months later symptoms of his illness regained momentum. In a letter of 31 March to his friend Leopold Kupelwieser, he describes the failure of his latest opera projects and voices his despair over his health situation. In the letter he also mentions his latest chamber music compositions (the String Quartets  and 810, and the Octet ), and his plan to write another Quartet, after which he adds:
He ends the letter referring to his anticipated second visit to Zseliz:

On 7 May Schubert attended the concert in which Beethoven presented his 9th Symphony. Feeling in better health, he was in Zseliz by the end of the month, again as music teacher of the Esterházy family for the summer season. Around this time his friend Moritz von Schwind wrote to Kupelwieser informing him that the composer had left for Hungary, planning to write a symphony. The Deutsch catalogue lists three compositions, all for piano four-hands, which Schubert composed during his first couple of months in Zseliz:
 Sonata in C major, D 812: autograph parts dated June 1824.
 , composed between late May and the middle of July.
 , composed in July.

In the second half of July the composer wrote to his brother Ferdinand, starting with an analysis of the sorrow brought by his absence, followed by:

This indicates that these pieces for piano four-hands were performed there and then, shortly after their completion by the composer, maybe even by the young countesses, his pupils. By around July 1824 symptoms of Schubert's venereal disease were as good as gone, which they would remain for the next two years. In August he writes to Schwind, again mentioning the Sonata D 812 and Variations D 813:

The "attracting star" is interpreted as referring to Countess Karoline, who was going to turn 19 in September. Still in August, Schwind wrote to Schober:

A few weeks after Karoline's birthday, Schubert feels even more desolate than a month earlier when writing to Schwind – from the composer's letter of 21 September 1824 to Schober (who had left Vienna in 1823):

Schubert returned to Vienna in October, in a carriage together with Baron , a friend of Count Esterházy to whom Schubert had dedicated Die schöne Müllerin and who had participated, together with the composer and members of the Esterházy family, in music performances at Zseliz. Some three decades later, after becoming a champion of Schubert's music, Schönstein wrote:

In the summer of 1825, Schubert stayed in Gmunden from early June to the middle of July, and in Bad Gastein from the middle of August till early September. Contemporary correspondence of his friends makes clear he was working on a Symphony, later dubbed Gmunden-Gastein Symphony. In March 1828, on the anniversary of Beethoven's death, Schubert gave his only public concert: its scale was somewhat smaller than the ambition he voiced in his letter to Kupelwieser four years earlier (only chamber music was performed), but it was a considerable success. That same year he composed his last major work for piano four-hands, the Fantasia in F minor, D 940, which he dedicated to Karoline Esterházy. In 1829, the year after Schubert's death, it was published as his Op. 103. That year, some of the obituaries written by Schubert's friends mentioned a Symphony, composed in Bad Gastein in 1825, which was particularly liked by the composer.

Movements

The Sonata in C major, D 812, in four movements, is the most elaborate of the four-hands piano pieces Schubert wrote during his summer in Zseliz in 1824. Performance time of the Sonata ranges from less than 37 minutes to over 47 minutes.
I. Allegro moderato
This main theme consists of two phrases, each followed by a quiet cadence. The second subject, a melodious variant of the first, is presented in A-flat major in the secondo part, and is later shared by both pianists. The relatively short development section starts with a transposed version of the principal subject. In the concluding recapitulation, which has some striking modulations, the second theme is heard in a C minor tonality. The movement concludes with a broad coda.
II. Andante
 The Sonata's slow movement, in  time, is an andante in A-flat major. There is little complexity in the opening theme, but there is ingenuity in how both pianists imitate one another, with some daring harmonic clashes.
III. Scherzo and Trio
 The Scherzo movement is an allegro vivace with pianistic percussive dissonances. Its Trio is in F minor and has a straightfoward rhythm contrasted with a melody with phrases of different lengths.
IV. Allegro vivace
The second theme has a Dvořákian look and feel. Passages where the themes are divided between the two pianists are demanding for the performers.

Reception
The Sonata D 812 was published after Schubert's death, in 1837, when it was printed with the title Grand Duo. Schumann published his commentary, in which he described the work as a more feminine version of a Beethovenian symphony, in 1838. Joseph Joachim's symphonic arrangement of the Sonata was premiered a few years before the piano duet version had its first public performance in 1859. From the late 19th century to the second half of the 20th century it was thought possible that the Grand Duo was a piano version of the Gmunden-Gastein Symphony. Piano duos performing the Sonata include Sviatoslav Richter and Benjamin Britten, and Daniel Barenboim and Radu Lupu.

19th century
When Anton Diabelli published the Grand Duo as Schubert's Op. 140 on 29 December 1837, he dedicated the edition to Clara Wieck, whom he also gave Schubert's autograph of the Sonata. A few months later, her future husband, Robert Schumann, wrote about the piece and its composer: 

In 1855 Joseph Joachim orchestrated the Grand Duo on Johannes Brahms's instigation. The arrangement was first performed in February 1856 in Hannover. In Leipzig, Joachim's Symphony after the Piano Duo in C major was performed in 1859 and 1864. Brahms conducted Joachim's version several times in the 1870s. Following in Diabelli's footsteps, Joachim dedicated his arrangement to Clara Schumann. Joachim omitted the tempo indication for the 3rd movement, and replaced the Allegro vivace of the "Finale" movement by Allegro moderato. In London, the Symphony after Schubert's Grand Duo was first performed in 1876, under Joachim's direction.

Schubert's original piano duet version was premiered in December 1859. The 19th-century collected edition of Schubert's works adopted the Sonata in the second volume of its 9th series in 1888, edited by Anton Door. In the last decades of the 19th century there was a renewed attention for the Gmunden-Gastein Symphony: according to authors such as George Grove it was lost without a trace. Others entertained the idea that the Grand Duo might be a piano version of that Symphony.

20th century
Donald Tovey wrote about the Grand Duo in 1935, mostly reiterating Schumann's views, and further contributing to the conflation of the Gmunden-Gastein Symphony with the piano four-hands Sonata. According to Tovey, Schubert's Sonata was void of pianistic characteristics. Like Tovey, Bernard Shore found the work effective when orchestrated. New orchestrations of the Sonata were provided by Felix Weingartner, Anthony Collins (1939), Marius Flothuis (1940–42), Karl Salomon (1946) and Fritz Oeser (1948). Karl Ulrich Schnabel's arrangement of the Sonata for one pianist was published in 1949. Arturo Toscanini recorded Joachim's orchestral version of Schubert's Op. 140 with the NBC Symphony Orchestra in 1941. Another recording of Joachim's arrangement, by Felix Prohaska conducting the Vienna State Opera Orchestra, was released in January 1951. Clemens Krauss conducted the Bavarian Radio Symphony Orchestra in a 1954 recording of Karl Frotzler's orchestration of the Grand Duo.

In his 1958 biography of the composer,  writes that "the proportions of the [Grand Duo] suggest a symphony rather than a sonata," but he rejects the idea promoted by Schumann and Tovey that it would be a symphony in disguise. When Schubert wrote a draft of a symphony down as a piano score he would title it Symphony: not so with the Sonata in C major, the autograph of which is not a draft but a fair copy, thus, according to Brown, representing the composer's final word on the matter. Symphonic effects are legion in all of Schubert's piano compositions, the 1824 Sonata for piano four-hands being no exception in that regard. Brown is unconvinced by the orchestral versions, which he sees as betraying the pianistic origins of the piece. According to Brown, there is a difference in how Schubert organises a symphony and how he organises a sonata, the Grand Duo following the principles of the latter composition type: Brown illustrates that with a few comparisons between the four-hand piano composition and solo piano sonatas which Schubert wrote around the same time. The arguments against the "symphony in disguise" proposition are summarized thus in the 1978 edition of the Deutsch catalogue:

The piano duet version of D 812 was recorded by:
 Paul Badura-Skoda and Jörg Demus (1951)
 Gold and Fizdale (1955)
 Alfred Brendel and Évelyne Crochet (1962)
 Jörg Demus and Paul Badura-Skoda (1963; live; recording time: 36:26)
 Sviatoslav Richter and Benjamin Britten (1965; mono; live; recording time: 39:12)
 Christian Ivaldi and Noël Lee (1977; recording time: 36:53)
 Anne Queffélec and Imogen Cooper (1978; recording time: 41:05)
 Alfons and Aloys Kontarsky (1979)
 Christoph Eschenbach and Justus Frantz (1979; recording time: 47:21)
 Minkofski-Garrigues Kilian Duo (1985)
 Peter Noke and Helen Krizos (April 1986; recording time: 42:46)
 Duo Crommelynck (1987)
 Isabel Beyer and Harvey Dagul (1993; recording time: 45:42)
 Klavierduo Stenzl (1993)
 Duo Tal & Groethuysen (1995)
 Daniel Barenboim and Radu Lupu (1996; recording time: 43:13)
 Robert Levin and Malcolm Bilson (1996; recording time: 46:32)
  and Karl-Hermann Mrongovius (1997; recording time: 44:20)
 Anthony Goldstone and Caroline Clemmow (1998; recording time: 36:18)
 Duo Alkan (2000)

René Leibowitz orchestrated the Grand Duo around 1965. In 1986  returned to the issue of whether the Sonata D 812 is rather pianistic or rather orchestral: he saw many passages, such as transitions realised with a filigree typical for Schubert's piano style, that proved too difficult to orchestrate convincingly, and only a few, such as pedal notes, which are helped by an orchestral realisation – but then, Schubert was far from the only composer using such long notes in compositions written for pianofortes that couldn't sustain a sound for very long.  In 1991, Raymond Leppard recorded his own orchestration of D 812. Joachim's arrangement of the Grand Duo was, in the last decades of the 20th century, recorded by:
 Claudio Abbado conducting the Chamber Orchestra of Europe (1987)
 Michael Halász conducting the Failoni Orchestra (1994)
 Leon Botstein conducting the American Symphony Orchestra (1994)
 Christoph Eschenbach with the Houston Symphony (1996)

Schubert's autograph of the Sonata ended up in the Bodleian Library, as part of the Margaret Deneke Mendelssohn collection. Scholarship of the 1970s and the 1980s identified the Gmunden-Gastein Symphony with Schubert's last symphony, the "Great" C major Symphony, D 944. In the late 1980s Schumann's contentions about Schubert's feminity started to attract attention from a different perspective: articles published in 19th-Century Music described Schubert as homosexual, to which the 1838 comments about the Grand Duo, published in the Neue Zeitschrift für Musik, were seen as corroborating evidence. Joseph Horowitz published articles about the Grand Duo in the New York Times: in 1992 commenting on Leppard's recording of his orchestrated version, and in 2000 when Barenboim and Lupu had programmed the piano version of the Sonata for a Carnegie Hall concert. According to Horowitz, the imitation of orchestral sounds is idiosyncratic of Schubert's piano style, and, in short, the four-hands piano work is, notwithstanding many symphonic characteristics and the difficulty to make it sound well on piano, no symphony.

21st century

Pianists recording the Grand Duo in the 21st century:
 Claire Aebersold and Ralph Neiweem (2004)
 Duo Koroliov (2004)
 Evgeny Kissin and James Levine (2005; live; recording time: 40:49)
  (2005; recording time: 37:15)
 Allan Schiller and John Humphreys (2007; recording time: 43:35)
 Duo d'Accord (Lucia Huang & Sebastian Euler; 2009; recording time: 38:42)
 Jonathan Plowright and Aaron Shorr (2012; live; video recording)
 Ismaël Margain and Guillaume Bellom (2012)
 Adrienne Soós and Ivo Haag (2018; recording time: 42:42)

In his book on Schubert's Winterreise, Ian Bostridge writes that the scholarly discussions about whether the composer was homosexual died out some two decades after they began. Giving an overview of these discussions, Bostridge describes it as anachronistic to paste late 20th-century concepts about gayness to Schubert's early 19th-century world: androgyny, the femininity alluded to by Schumann, even homo-eroticism as in some of Goethe's writings (e.g. the "Ganymed" poem which was set by Schubert), belonged to that early Romantic world, without it being possible to conclude anything sexual (as in homosexual) with regard to the composer from that cultural environment. Schubert fell in love with Karoline Esterházy, like he had fallen in love with other women before, as testified in contemporary documents, some of which were additionally uncovered during the late 20th- to early 21st-century discussions about the topic, for instance by Rita Steblin. Another overview of the same topic, like Bostridge's from the middle of the second decade of the 21st century, is given in Julian Horton's Schubert: also this author sees overinterpretation in some of the 1990s analyses concluding on Schubert's sexuality.

Of all the orchestral arrangements of D 812, only Joachim's remained as repertoire piece. The Berliner Philharmoniker, conducted by Murray Perahia, performed it in a January 2013 concert. , who wrote the programme notes for that concert, distances himself from the idea that Schubert would have unconsciously written for orchestra while composing the Sonata. In a contribution published in 2016, Hans-Joachim Hinrichsen analyses the part of Schubert's March 1824 letter to Kupelwieser about paving his way to the grand symphony via chamber music compositions. Hinrichsen writes about a caesura in Schubert's output, following that letter, in which the composer re-orientates from primarily vocal music (such as operas that had been rejected shortly before), to instrumental music, in preparation of reaching a wider audience via a symphonic concert. The Sonata in C major for piano four-hands was the first major work after that caesura: according to Hinrichsen, Schubert's ambition was however not to learn how to write for orchestra (which he already knew how to do) via these chamber music compositions, but rather, how to write for a wider audience than his circle of friends (who would like whatever he composed). Hence Schubert's yearning, by the end of the summer, to let the Viennese public judge the first results of this new approach, instead of the easy success in rural Hungary.

References

Sources

Further reading

External links 
 

Piano sonatas by Franz Schubert
Compositions for piano four-hands
1824 compositions
Compositions in C major
Compositions by Franz Schubert published posthumously